Cross Creek is a  long 4th order tributary to the Ohio River in Brooke County, West Virginia.

Course
Cross Creek rises about 1.5 miles northeast of Buffalo, Pennsylvania, in Washington County and then flows northwesterly into West Virginia and Brooke County to join the Ohio River about 1 mile south of Follansbee, West Virginia.

Watershed
Cross Creek drains  of area, receives about 40.1 in/year of precipitation, has a wetness index of 332.83, and is about 59% forested.

See also
List of rivers of Pennsylvania
List of rivers of West Virginia

References

Rivers of West Virginia
Rivers of Pennsylvania
Rivers of Washington County, Pennsylvania
Rivers of Brooke County, West Virginia
Tributaries of the Ohio River